Cleistocactus strausii, the silver torch or wooly torch, is a perennial flowering plant in the family Cactaceae.

In its natural habitat it receives plenty of water during the summer, but almost none over the winter. In cultivation, watering too much in winter often leads to root rot.

In common with other cacti in the genus Cleistocactus, the flowers hardly open, with only the style and stamens protruding. Cultivated plants often flower freely. In the United Kingdom, this plant is usually grown under glass, and has gained the Royal Horticultural Society's Award of Garden Merit.

Description
Only older plants will produce the deep red/burgundy cylindrical flowers. These flowers emerge horizontally and radially from the stem of the cactus. They are deep red to burgundy and grow up to 10cm long.

Habitat
Cleistocactus strausii prefers mountainous regions that are dry and semi-arid. Like other cacti and succulents, it thrives in porous soil and full sun. While partial sunlight is the minimum requirement for survival, full sunlight for several hours a day is required for the silver torch cactus to bloom flowers.  

Silver torch cacti can thrive in low-nitrogen soils without facing the consequences. Too much water will make the plants weak and lead to root rot.

Conservation status
This cactus is locally abundant in its native land and has few local threats to its survival, so it is rated Least Concern.

Propagation
It can be propagated by cuttings or seed. Cuttings should be taken near the base of the main stem, similar to cuttings for aloe vera. Rooting of this new cutting usually occurs within 3-8 weeks, therefore it is usually better to propagate silver torch cactus via seed.

Pests
The silver torch cactus is most susceptible to mealybugs and spider mite. 

Mealybugs are among the most common pests of cacti and succulents. They can be identified by their white, cottony masses on the plant. These are signs that the bugs are reproducing. These pests are especially problematic because they suck out plant sap, depleting the strength of the plant. They can also cause sooty mold along with their fluffy white wax, detracting from the plants'appearance. Another form of mealybug attacks the root system of plants, which is harder to detect.

Mites thrive in the same hot, dry conditions that the silver torch cactus lives in. Spider mites cause damage by sucking out vital nutrients from the plant. Large populations of mites can cause irreversible damage, eventually killing the plant. 

However, both pests can be hosed off with water.

Gallery

References

W. (2016, December 27). Cleistocactus strausii - Silver Torch Cactus. Retrieved April 16, 2018, from https://worldofsucculents.com/cleistocactus-strausii-silver-torch-cactus-snow-pole/
Mealybugs in the Greenhouse. (n.d.). Retrieved April 16, 2018, from https://content.ces.ncsu.edu/insect-and-related-pests-of-flowers-and-foliage-plants/mealybugs-in-the-greenhouse
Silver Torch Cactus. (n.d.). Retrieved April 16, 2018, from https://web.archive.org/web/20171014004620/http://www.horticultureunlimited.com/plant-guide/silver-torch-cactus/
Silver Torch Cactus - Cleistocactus strausii - Overview. (n.d.). Retrieved April 16, 2018, from http://eol.org/pages/5188261/overview
Plants & Flowers. (n.d.). Retrieved April 16, 2018, from https://web.archive.org/web/20181019164012/http://www.plantsrescue.com/tag/silver-torch-cactus/

External links

University of Connecticut Ecology department

Trichocereeae
Cacti of South America
Flora of Bolivia
Flora of the Andes
Garden plants of South America